Alakhadzi is a village in the Gagra District of Abkhazia.

Demographics
At the time of the 2011 Census, Alakhadzi had a population of 2,876. Of these, 45.5% were Armenian, 31.1% Abkhaz, 13.1% Russian, 6.4% Georgian, 1.1% Ukrainian and 0.5% Greek

Notes

See also
 Gagra District

References

Gagra District Administration

Other

Populated places in Gagra District